Traisen can refer to:

Germany:
 Traisen, Germany, a municipality in Rhineland-Palatinate, Germany

Austria:
 Traisen (river), a river in Lower Austria, Austria
 Traisen, Austria, a town in Lower Austria, named after River Traisen

See also 
 Traiskirchen, Austria
 Traismauer, Austria, named after River Traisen